Ernest Cox (February 17, 1894 – February 26, 1962), was a Canadian football player in  the Canadian Football League.

Cox was born in Hamilton, Ontario.  He played for eleven seasons for the Hamilton Tigers.  He died in his home town of Hamilton, and was inducted into the Canadian Football Hall of Fame in 1963 and into the Canada's Sports Hall of Fame in 1975.

References
 Canada's Sports Hall of Fame profile

1894 births
1962 deaths
Sportspeople from Hamilton, Ontario
Players of Canadian football from Ontario
Canadian Football Hall of Fame inductees
Hamilton Tigers football players